Goddeti Madhavi is an Indian politician. She was elected to the Lok Sabha, lower house of the Parliament of India from Araku, Andhra Pradesh in the 2019 Indian general election as a member of the YSR Congress Party. She is the youngest member of parliament from Andhra Pradesh. She is a physical education teacher. Her father, the late Goddeti Demudu, was a communist leader and former legislator.

Personal life 
On October 18, 2019, Madhavi married Siva Prasad, who had played a key role in her poll campaign. she is alumni of Jawahar Navodaya Vidyalaya.

References

External links
 Official biographical sketch in Parliament of India website

1992 births
Living people
India MPs 2019–present
Lok Sabha members from Andhra Pradesh
YSR Congress Party politicians
People from Visakhapatnam district